Sonoita may refer to

 Sonoita, a genus of spiders containing one species, Sonoita lightfooti

places in the United States:
 Sonoita, a place in Santa Cruz County, Arizona
 Sonoita AVA, Arizona wine region in Santa Cruz County
 Sonoita Creek,  a river Santa Cruz County

places in Mexico:
 Sonoyta, a town in Sonora